Edgar J. McNabb (October 24, 1865 – February 28, 1894), nicknamed "Pete" or "Texas," was an American right-handed pitcher for the 1893 Baltimore Orioles.  After one season in Major League Baseball, he committed suicide after shooting his girlfriend.

Career
Born in Coshocton, Ohio, McNabb pitched in 21 games for the Baltimore Orioles between May 12 and August 11, 1893.  He pitched 12 complete games with a win–loss record of 8–7, and a 4.12 ERA. Despite a good record with the eighth place Orioles, he was not re-signed and he joined a minor league team in Grand Rapids, Michigan for the 1894 season.  He had previously played for a minor league in Denver, Colorado.

Death
McNabb's girlfriend of one year, Louise Kellogg (sometimes referred to as Laura Kellogg), was noted to be a "shapely" blond actress who was married to R.E. Rockwell, a Seattle ice merchant, who was also President of the Pacific Coast League and the Northwest League.  McNabb and Kellogg were staying at the Eiffel Hotel in Pittsburgh, when, at approximately 8:00 p.m., witnesses heard gunshots, screaming, and scuffling coming from their room.  A friend of McNabb's broke down the door of the hotel room, finding Mrs. Kellogg lying in a pool of blood, having been shot through the neck twice, and McNabb dead from a self-inflicted gunshot wound to the mouth.  Kellogg was paralyzed from the waist down and died later from her injuries.

The speculation surrounding this incident began with money.  According to a Pittsburgh Post-Gazette article, letters found in the room indicated that Kellogg was planning to end the relationship, having been sending him money over the winter, and that the couple were nearly broke.  Police surmised that an argument developed, ending in McNabb shooting Kellogg and then turning the gun on himself.  McNabb is interred at Mound View Cemetery in Mount Vernon, Ohio.

See also

 List of baseball players who died during their careers

References

Bibliography
 Connor, Floyd. (2006). Baseball's Most Wanted. Sterling Publishing Company, Inc. .
 James, Bill. (2003). The New Bill James Historical Baseball Abstract. Simon and Schuster. .
 Podoll, Brian A. (2003). The Minor League Milwaukee Brewers, 1859–1952. McFarland. .

External links

 
 Coshcocton, Ohio Site on McNabb

1865 births
1894 deaths
19th-century baseball players
Major League Baseball pitchers
Baltimore Orioles (NL) players
Portland Webfeet players
Baseball players from Ohio
People from Coshocton, Ohio
Murder–suicides in Pennsylvania
Suicides by firearm in Pennsylvania
Newton (minor league baseball) players
Leavenworth Soldiers players
Waco Babies players
Waco Texans players
Denver Grizzlies (baseball) players
Denver Mountaineers players
Portland Gladiators players
Omaha Lambs players
Los Angeles Seraphs players
1890s suicides